Highway Rider is a contemporary jazz album by American pianist Brad Mehldau released in 2010 by Nonesuch Records.

Background
It was Mehldau's second collaboration with producer Jon Brion (the other is the 2002 album Largo), and it features saxophonist Joshua Redman, drummer Matt Chamberlain, and Chamber orchestra led by Dan Coleman, as well as Mehldau's regular trio partners, bassist Larry Grenadier and drummer Jeff Ballard.

Track listing

Personnel
Band
Brad Mehldau – Piano (Disc 1: 1–5, 7; Disc 2: 1–6, 8), Pump Organ (Disc 1: 2; Disc 2: 3), Yamaha CS-80 Polyphonic Analog Synthesizer (Disc 1: 4), Orchestral Bells (Disc 1: 7; Disc 2: 1, 8), Handclaps (Disc 2: 2)
Jeff Ballard – Percussion (Disc 1: 1, 5; Disc 2: 2), snare brush (Disc 1: 2), Drums (Disc 1: 7; Disc 2: 1, 4, 6, 8); Handclaps (Disc 2: 2)
Joshua Redman – Soprano Saxophone (Disc 1: 1, 5; Disc 2: 2, 8), Tenor Saxophone (Disc 1: 2, 7; Disc 2: 1, 3, 5), Handclaps (Disc 2: 2)
Larry Grenadier – Bass (Disc 1: 2, 4, 7; Disc 2: 1, 3, 4, 6, 8), Handclaps (Disc 2: 2)
Matt Chamberlain – drums (Disc 1: 2, 4, 5, 7, 8; Disc 2: 2, 3), Handclaps (Disc 2: 2)
Orchestra, Dan Coleman, Conductor (Disc 1: 1, 2, 6, 7; Disc 2: 1, 7, 8)
The Fleurettes – Vocals (Disc 1: 5)

Production
Jon Brion – producer, mixing
Gregg Koller – engineer, mixing
Eric Caudieux – engineer
Alan Yoshida – mastering
Robert Hurwitz – executive producer
Richard Misrach – cover photograph
Lawrence Azerrad – graphic design

References

Further reading
Mats Arvidson: An Imaginary Musical Road Movie: Transmedial Semiotic Structures in Brad Mehldau's Concept Album Highway Rider THE FACULTIES OF HUMANITIES AND THEOLOGY LUND UNIVERSITY

2010 albums
Brad Mehldau albums
Albums produced by Jon Brion
Nonesuch Records albums